Trausti Stefánsson (born 20 January 1985) is an Icelandic sprinter and former basketball player. He set the Icelandic record in the 400-meter sprint (indoors) in 2012.

Basketball
Trausti played with Úrvalsdeild karla club Íþróttafélag Reykjavíkur until 2007. He was a member of ÍR's team that won the Icelandic Cup in February 2007. He retired from basketball following the season.

Track and field
During the 2006 basketball off-season, Trausti starting doing track and field at the age of 21. A year later he quit basketball to fully focus on his sprinting career.

2012 IAAF World Indoor Championships
Trausti was selected to represent Iceland at the 2012 IAAF World Indoor Championships. He participated in the 400 metres. He ended in 21st place out of 31.

References

External links
Trausti Stefánsson IAAF Profile

Trausti Stefansson
Trausti Stefansson
Living people
1985 births
Trausti Stefansson